Dzierżanowo may refer to the following places in Poland:

 Dzierżanowo, Maków County
 Dzierżanowo, Płock County